This is a list of notable events in Latin music (music from the Spanish- and Portuguese-speaking areas of Latin America, Latin Europe, and the United States) that took place in 1989.

Events 
February 22The 31st Annual Grammy Awards are held at The Shrine Auditorium in Los Angeles:
Roberto Carlos wins the Grammy Award for Best Latin Pop Performance for his 1988 self-titled album.
Linda Ronstadt wins the Grammy Award for Best Mexican/Mexican-American Performance for Canciones de Mi Padre.
Rubén Blades wins the Grammy Award for Best Tropical Latin Performance for Antecedente.
May 31The inaugural Lo Nuestro Awards is presented by American television network Univision. It is the first Spanish-language music award show to not reveal the winners before the broadcast. Mexican band Los Bukis and Puerto Rican singer Lalo Rodríguez tie for the most awards with three wins.

Number-ones albums and singles by country 
List of number-one albums of 1989 (Spain)
List of number-one singles of 1989 (Spain)
List of number-one Billboard Latin Pop Albums of 1989
List of number-one Billboard Regional Mexican Albums of 1989
List of number-one Billboard Tropical Albums of 1989
List of number-one Billboard Top Latin Songs of 1989

Awards 
1989 Premio Lo Nuestro
1989 Tejano Music Awards

Albums released

First quarter

January

February

March

Second quarter

April

May

June

Third quarter

July

August

September

Fourth quarter

October

November

December

Dates unknown

Best-selling records

Best-selling albums
The following is a list of the top 5 best-selling Latin albums of 1990 in the United States divided into the categories of Latin pop, Regional Mexican, and Tropical/salsa, according to Billboard.

Best-performing songs
The following is a list of the top 10 best-performing Latin songs in the United States in 1990, according to Billboard.

Births 
May 11Prince Royce, American bachata singer
May 31Pablo Alborán, Spanish pop singer
September 3Gusttavo Lima, Brazilian sertanejo singer
October 5Gerardo Ortíz, Mexican banda singer

Deaths

References 

 
Latin music by year